The following is a list of glaciers in Pakistan: With more than 7,253 known glaciers, Pakistan contains more glacial ice than any other country on Earth outside the polar regions. Almost all of them are located in the northern regions of Gilgit-Baltistan and Khyber Pakhtunkhwa.

A
Abruzzi Glacier

B

Baltoro Glacier 
Batura Glacier
Biafo Glacier
Biarchedi Glacier
Bilafond Glacier in the Siachen area claimed by both Pakistan and India, control by Pakistan.

C
Chogo Lungma Glacier

G
Godwin-Austen Glacier
Gondogoro Glacier
Ghulkin Glacier

K 

 Kutia Lungma Glacier
 karakrom Glacier

M
 Malanguti Glacier
 Miar Glacier

P
Panmah Glacier
Passu Glacier

R
Rupal Glacier

S
Sachiokuh Glacier
Sarpo Laggo Glacier
Shaigri Glacier
Shandar Glacier
Shani Glacier
Shireen Maidan Glacier
Shishpar Glacier
Shuijerab Glacier
Shutwerth Glacier
Silkiang Glacier
Sim Glacier
Siru Glacier
Skora La Glacier
Sokha Glacier
South Barum Glacier
Sovoia Glacier
Stokpa Lungma Glacier
Sumayar Bar Glacier

T
Tarashing Glacier
Thalo Glacier
Thui Glacier
Toltar Glacier
Toshain Glacier
Trango Glacier
Trivor Glacier
Tsarak Tsa Glacier

U
Udren Glacier
Uli Biaho Glacier
Ultar Glacier
Upper Khurdopin Glacier
Upper Tirich Glacier

V

 Vigne Glacier

W
West Vigne Glacier
Wyeen Glacier
Waniya Glacier

Y
Yermanendu Glacier
Yazghill Glacier
Yishkuk Glacier
Yukshgoz Glacier

Z
Zindikharam Glacier

See also
 List of glaciers

References

Glaciers
Pakistan
Glaciers
Glaciers